Sidorkin is a Russian masculine surname, its feminine counterpart is Sidorkina. Notable people with the surname include:

Vita Sidorkina (born 1994), Russian model
Vladimir Sidorkin (born 1986), Estonian swimmer

Russian-language surnames